Nagmani Kushwaha  (born 15 Jan 1953) is an Indian politician from Bihar and Jharkhand. He is the son of another Bihar politician Jagdeo Prasad, in whose party Shoshit Samaj Dal, Nagmani started his career. He has served as an MLA for Kurtha as well as an MP for Chatra. Nagmani is known for the frequency with which he changes parties - As of 2014, he had changed political affiliations 11 times.

He announced the formation of Rashtriya Shoshit Samaj Party on 13 September 2021.

Political career 

In 2001, he broke away from the Rashtriya Janata Dal to form Rashtriya Janata Dal (Democratic) and was made Minister of State for Social Justice & Empowerment in the Vajpayee government. He later merged Rashtriya Janata Dal (Democratic) with the Bhartiya Janata Party. Post Bhartiya Janata Party lost power in the center, Nagmani joined Ram Vilas Paswan's Lok Janshakti Party before switch over to the Janata Dal (United). His wife made a minister in the Nitish Kumar government and he was elected in the Bihar Legislative Council. Then he joined Nationalist Congress Party but left ahead of the 2014 Lok Sabha elections and joined All Jharkhand Students Union.

In 2015, he formed Samras Samaj Party announced the formation of a third front known as the Socialist Secular Morcha an alliance of six parties SP, Nationalist Congress Party, Jan Adhikar Party, Samras Samaj Party, (National People's Party) and Samajwadi Janata Party.

In 2017, Nagmanai joined Upendra Kushwaha's Rashtriya Lok Samta Party by merging his party and calling Kushwaha to be next Chief Minister of Bihar. He was named National Executive President of Rashtriya Lok Samta Party but was sacked for allegedly indulging in anti-party activities in 2019. He resigned from the party. Following which he joined the Janata Dal (United) but quit six months later.

References

1953 births
Living people
Lok Sabha members from Bihar
Members of the Cabinet of India
Members of the Bihar Legislative Assembly
Indian National Congress politicians
Rashtriya Janata Dal politicians
Lok Janshakti Party politicians
Janata Dal politicians
Janata Dal (United) politicians
Bharatiya Janata Party politicians from Jharkhand
Samras Samaj Party politicians
Nationalist Congress Party politicians from Bihar
All Jharkhand Students Union politicians
Jharkhand politicians by Rashtriya Janata Dal